Senior societies at University of Pennsylvania are an important part of student life.

Activity-based

Bell Senior Society
The Bell Senior Society was founded in 2014. The organization brings together students involved with innovation and technology around Penn's campus. New members are selected by the previous class based on potential, and passion for technology and entrepreneurship.

Kinoki Senior Society
Kinoki was founded in the spring of 2014. This organization brings together students who are passionate about film and plan on pursuing careers in the entertainment industry.

Omega Honor Society
The Zeta Xi Chapter of the Order of Omega was rechartered at Penn in 2014. Unlike its "Omega" counterpart below, the chapter has both a university affiliation with the Office of Fraternity and Sorority Life, and a national affiliation. Omega is composed of juniors and seniors who best represent the positive aspects of Greek life: character, scholarship, service, and leadership.

Omega Senior Society
The Omega Senior Society, or The O.R.D.E.R., exists to recognize leadership in the Greek community. It is composed of influential members of Greek organizations and other similar student groups (colloquially known as "off-campus fraternities/sororities").

Osiris Senior Society
Osiris, founded in the spring of 2013 by Lainie Huston and Jackson Foster, brings together senior leaders and outstanding members of the performing arts community. The society draws its name from the god Osiris, who was believed by some in ancient Greco-Egyptian times to have been the god who brought together the nine muses. Similarly, the society provides a forum for students of different art forms, including vocal, dance, theatrical, instrumental, photographic, and tech among others, to strengthen ties across the performing arts community. Throughout the year, members attend social events and support each other at shows, and each May members perform a senior showcase highlighting the talents of these students and fostering collaborative performance.

Identity-based

Atlas Senior Society
The Atlas Society was founded in 2016 by five international students. Atlas strives to create an ethnically and culturally diverse community of international students who have demonstrated leadership and an interest in intercultural learning and global experiences. The founding class includes 21 members from 18 countries and territories.

Carriage Senior Society
The Carriage Senior Society, founded in the spring of 2013, is a senior honor society of leaders from around campus who are members of the LGBTQ+ community. It is named for the home of the University's LGBT Center, Carriage House. Their symbol is a twelve-spoked carriage wheel and members refer to themselves as "Spokes."

New members are added both as Juniors in their spring semester and as Seniors in their fall semester. While members continue the traditional tap system for potential applicants, in recent years an open invitation to the informational "Smoker" has been distributed to LGBTQ groups on campus. Any eligible student who attends the Smoker is then welcome to apply whether or not they have been tapped. An effort is made to include a diversity of identities and areas of leadership on campus in each class.

Cipactli Latino Honor Society
The Cipactli Latino Honor Society was founded in 2001. The mission and purpose of Cipactli is to acknowledge individual academic achievement, leadership, and distinguished service to the Latino community. Cipactli is the only Latino honor society in the Ivy League.

The members of Cipactli are chosen anytime between their junior fall semester and senior fall semester, and go through a rigorous application process. They are chosen for their outstanding work both in and outside the academic sphere, as well as their deep commitment to helping their communities develop in a sustainable and meaningful way. Cipactli's philosophy is known as "The three pillars of Cipactli", which are Leadership, Academic Achievement, and Community Service.

Onyx Senior Society
The Onyx Senior Society was founded in 1974. With the aid of administrators Provost Elliot, Alice E. Emerson (Dean of Students), and Harold Haskins (Dean of Students), the honor society to encourages high academic achievement and community service at the university. The society recognizes outstanding performance within, and outside of, the classroom. The organization plays a significant role in promoting the academic success of minority students who operate in a competitive environment.

One of the goals of Onyx was to re-establish the Society for African-American Students at the University of Pennsylvania. The society provided an all-expenses-paid program for black students in the summer before their first year. The program lasted from 1969–72, and concentrated on preparing its participants for the academic mainstream by providing books, room and board, a stipend, and two credited courses. This program later birthed the Pre-Freshman Program. In response to such changes, the goals of Onyx have also changed and developed over time. In the past, Onyx has focused on forums as a means to inform the campus community about black issues. Forum topics have included the organization and promotion of networking within the black community, and mentoring, both on campus and in the surrounding Philadelphia community. Onyx hopes to create a positive social experience for blacks at the university, and to recognize black achievement, past and present. Notable members of Onyx include Grammy Award-winning singer John "Legend" Stephens, former U.S. Congressman Harold Ford Jr., and former mayor of New Orleans and current National Urban League President and CEO, Marc Morial.

Oracle Senior Honor Society
The Oracle Senior Honor Society was founded in the fall of 2002. It recognizes outstanding members of each senior class who demonstrate passion, leadership, commitment and achievement as a student of Asian Pacific heritage or for the Asian Pacific community at the University of Pennsylvania. Since its founding, Oracle has represented leadership from organizations that span all facets of university life, from academics and service organizations, to cultural and performing arts groups, to Greek life and student government.

As a self-perpetuating senior society, juniors have the opportunity to apply for the society in the spring, and seniors have the opportunity to apply in the fall. Potential members, all of whom have served the university in some leadership capacity, learn more about the society and to meet the current members at an informal smoker. Each prospective member must then submit a written application detailing their qualifications. The current senior class selects the new class of Oracle members, representative of the diverse student population, by selecting from the applicant pool based on their fit to Oracle's purpose of demonstrating passion, leadership, commitment, and achievement.

Shamash Senior Society 
Shamash Senior Society was founded in April 2018 in order to celebrate and create a community surrounding Jewish students on Penn's campus. The group aims to bring together leaders of the Jewish community and those that have established a commitment to leadership across campus that have a connection to Judaism. Shamash rests on four core tenets: impact, community, diversity, and service, and members are expected to uphold these tenets to the best of their ability.

The name of the society comes from the Hebrew word for "servant" or "attendant", and is more commonly known as the "helper" candle on the Hanukkah menorah. This symbolism reflects a connection between leadership and Judaism that underscores the mission of the society.

Shamash is composed of members of the graduating class of seniors. Potential new members are invited to apply at the end of their junior year for membership in the following year's class, as well as eligible to apply in the fall of their senior year as well.

School-based

Hexagon Senior Society
Hexagon is a senior society that is devoted to recognizing leaders of the School of Engineering and Applied Sciences. The society was founded in 1910 to promote fraternization across different engineering majors. Members often lead tours of the Engineering School buildings.

Lantern Senior Society 
The Lantern Society was founded in 1993. It is a senior society that is devoted to assemble a diverse group of outstanding Wharton undergraduates who have excelled academically, distinguished themselves as leaders among their peers, and contributed to the well-being of the community.

Nightingales Senior Society
The Nightingales Senior Society was founded in 2011. It is a society dedicated to senior nurses who have demonstrated leadership in the nursing school.

Gryphon Senior Society
The Gryphon Senior Society was founded in 2020. It is a society dedicated to recognizing outstanding student leaders in the College of Arts and Sciences.

Traditional societies
These were the first senior societies to be created at the University of Pennsylvania. The three traditional societies are Friars, Sphinx, and Mortarboard. Friars and Sphinx explicitly seek campus leaders, while Mortarboard seeks to recognize "achievements in scholarship, leadership, and service." Friars and Sphinx are exclusive to the University of Pennsylvania, whereas Mortarboard is a national honor society.

Friars Senior Society
Founded in 1899, Friars Senior Society is the oldest and most active undergraduate senior honor society at the University of Pennsylvania with over 2,100 alumni in the United States and in 23 countries throughout the world. Friars was formed to establish uncompromising democracy in university activities. Each class is composed of one-third athletic captains, one-third performing arts leaders, and one-third student government, Greek, publications and community service leaders. Friars promotes interaction between those from all walks of life who have given their time and energies to making the university what it is; hence the name Friars, for those who sacrifice their time during college to meaningful activities. Throughout Penn's history, society members have contributed to many aspects of Penn life, such as the addition of straw hats to Hey Day in 1949, the Penn mascot in 1964 and the creation of Spring Fling in 1975.

Mortar Board Senior Society
Mortar Board is a chapter of the national Mortar Board Senior Honor Society. It was the first and only senior society open to women until 1971, when Sphinx and Friars became co-ed. Mortar Board recognizes juniors and seniors for their achievement.

Sphinx Senior Society
The Sphinx Senior Society at the University of Pennsylvania, founded in 1900, is one of the most well-known honor societies at Penn, recognizing the top seniors who have made significant contributions to the university as leaders of the campus. Continuing in this tradition, the society has come to represent all facets of university life and has reflected the changing face of Penn's student body. Members today include leaders in student government, performing arts, media, service groups, cultural organizations, Greek life, athletics, and other realms of student affairs. Sphinx was the first senior society at Penn to admit African-Americans, doing so in 1952, and in February 1971  was the first to be co-ed.

Philomathean Society
Penn's oldest society, The Philomathean Society, was founded in 1813, and is one of the United States' oldest collegiate literary societies. It continues to host lectures and intellectual events open to the public.

Zelosophic Society
The Zelosophic Society, one of the two oldest senior societies at the University of Pennsylvania, was founded in 1829 as an alternative to its rival literary society, Philomathean Society (which was established 1813). 
Per Penn archives, “Zelosophic” is translated roughly as “endowed with a zeal for learning or wisdom” and its members were commonly called “Zelos”. The society’s purpose was to discuss literature and, like the Philomathean, to conduct debates. Per Penn archives, the Zelosophic Society's first two iterations lasted from 1829 to 1864 and again from 1892 to 1941. There is no present reported information that the society still exists though it is rumored that 20 students per graduating class are tapped to be part of this society. Their membership remains secretive.

Notes

References

External links
 Friars Senior Society
 Sphinx Senior Society
 Onyx Senior Society
 Ciactli Latino Honor Society
 Oracle Senior Honor Society
 Osiris Senior Society
 Omega Senior Society

Collegiate secret societies
Student societies in the United States
University of Pennsylvania